Bagnoli di Sopra is a comune (municipality) in the Province of Padua in the Italian region Veneto, located about  southwest of Venice and about  south of Padua.

Bagnoli di Sopra borders the following municipalities: Agna, Anguillara Veneta, Arre, Conselve, Tribano.

Demographic evolution

Sport
A.S.D. Bagnoli Calcio 1967

Twin towns
Bagnoli di Sopra is twinned with:

  Hard, Austria, since 1986

References

Cities and towns in Veneto